Bangani ( baṅgāṇī) is an Indo-Aryan language spoken in parts of Uttarkashi district in the west of the Garhwal region of Uttarakhand, India. It has been described either as a member of the Western Pahari language group, or as a dialect of the Central Pahari Garhwali language. It shares between one half and two thirds of its basic vocabulary with neighbouring varieties of Garhwali and with the Western Pahari languages of Jaunsari and Sirmauri.

Lexical similarity with neighbors
'''

Centum substrate hypothesis 
Bangani is of interest amongst scholars of Indo-European languages, due to some unusual features.

Since the 1980s, Claus Peter Zoller – a scholar of Indian linguistics and literature – has claimed that there is a centum language substrate in Bangani. Zoller has also suggested that Bangani has been misclassified as a dialect of Garhwali and is more closely related to the Western Pahari languages.

The substance of Zoller's claims has been rejected by George van Driem and Suhnu Sharma, in publications since 1996, which claim that Zoller's data was flawed and that Bangani is an unambiguously satem language. Zoller does not accept the findings by van Driem and Sharma, and claims that there are methodological issues and factual errors in van Driem and Sharma's work.

Support for Zoller's hypothesis and his underlying data has been offered by other linguists and Indologists, such as Anvita Abbi, Hans Henrich Hock, and Koenraad Elst.

References 

Northern Indo-Aryan languages
Languages of Uttarakhand
Indo-Aryan languages